Myopsocidae is a family of mouse-like barklice, belonging to the infraorder Psocetae of the order Psocodea (formerly Psocoptera). This family is closely related to Psocidae, with which it shares similar wing-venation, but from which it is distinguished by three-segmented tarsi.

There are about 8 genera and at least 180 described species in Myopsocidae.

Genera
These eight genera belong to the family Myopsocidae:
 Gyromyus c g
 Lichenomima Enderlein, 1910 i c g b
 Lophopterygella c g
 Mouldsia c g
 Myopsocus Hagen, 1866 i c g b
 Nimbopsocus c g
 Smithersia c g
 Thorntonodes c g
Data sources: i = ITIS, c = Catalogue of Life, g = GBIF, b = Bugguide.net

Sources 

 Lienhard, C. & Smithers, C. N. 2002. Psocoptera (Insecta): World Catalogue and Bibliography. Instrumenta Biodiversitatis, vol. 5. Muséum d'histoire naturelle, Genève.

Psocoptera families
Psocetae